Arum italicum subsp. albispathum is a flowering plant subspecies in the family Araceae.

Description
Arum italicum subsp. albispathum differs from other subspecies in having very pale, nearly white spathes and pale yellow spathe appendices. This subspecies is reported to have a lower chromosome number, with tetraploid counts in subsp. albispathum (2n = 56) and hexaploid counts in  subsp. italicum and  subsp. neglectum (2n = 84).

Habitat

It grows in woodlands from the Caucasus west to Crimea.

Taxonomy

Within the genus Arum, it belongs to subgenus Arum, and section Arum. Though currently considered a subspecies of Arum italicum, its relationship with the other subspecies of A. italicum and with Arum concinnatum are unclear and it may represent an independent species.

References

italicum subsp. albispathum